Moelleriopsis sincera is a species of sea snail, a marine gastropod mollusk, unassigned in the superfamily Seguenzioidea.

Description
The height of the shell attains 3.3 mm.

Distribution
This species occurs in the Atlantic Ocean off Georgia, USA and Northern Brazil at depths between 535 m and 805 m.

References

External links
 To Encyclopedia of Life
 To World Register of Marine Species

sincera
Gastropods described in 1890